Kuruma may refer to one of the following people:

Mamadu Ture Kuruma, born 1947,  Guinea-Bissauan military leader
Kuruma Samezō, born 1893, Japanese Marxist economist and writer 
Yoshiaki Kuruma, born 1961, Japanese radio announcer

It may also refer to:
 Kuruba, a Hindu caste
 Kuruma Ningyo, a Japanese style of puppetry as performed by company Hachioji Kuruma Ningyo
 Marsupenaeus, also known as kuruma shrimp
 Mount Kuruma, the tallest peak of Mount Kirigamine